Beautiful Darkness is a graphic novel illustrated by French illustrators Marie Pommepuy and Sébastien Cosset, whose names combine to form their pen name Kerascoët.

In the story, people the size of fruit flies are expelled from their home and thrust outside into the woods. The novel tells the tale of Aurora, a sweet girl who finds herself taking a leadership role in the community of tiny people. The story starts out with a whimsical tone but rapidly devolves into a morbid narrative. Although much of the plot revolves around Aurora, small segments of the story focus on side characters who serve to emphasize the contrast between the daunting situation at hand and the playful way characters interact.

Plot 
The protagonist Aurora is on a date with Prince Hector when they are suddenly expelled from their home, which happens to be the corpse of a young human girl. Everyone else living in the corpse is forced out as well, leaving them to figure out how to survive in the woods. Aurora takes leadership and begins helping everyone she can by gathering food and providing company. She befriends the narcissistic Zelie, who has a group of loyal followers that worship and spoil her.

Aurora's naïveté makes her blind to the fact that she is a victim of Zelie's manipulation. Hector, who was seemingly infatuated with Aurora, marries Zelie unexpectedly and Aurora is left alone. Her closest friends become part of Zelie's following. The betrayal strips Aurora of her sympathy and purity; her only goal from then on is to survive, no matter what the cost.

Aurora comes across a giant's cabin, where she can live without the others. Eventually, Zelie and her posse discover this cabin as well and make themselves at home. Aurora desperately wants them out of her new home, so she tricks them into gathering under a stove and watches as the giant unknowingly burns them alive. Finally, she can live in peace.

Characters 
 Aurora – Protagonist
 Plim – Aurora's cold-hearted friend and traitor
 Hector – Aurora's object of affection
 Zelie – Manipulative main antagonist
 Jane – Mysterious woman who Aurora admires
 Timothy – Aurora's timid one-eyed friend
 Rat – Aurora's rat friend, ultimately killed by Aurora herself
 Giant – Owner of the house in which Aurora makes her final home

Awards 
It received a nomination for an Eisner Award in 2015.

Critical reception 
A starred review on Publishers Weekly says the novel is always on readers' minds and "unforgettable". An exclusive preview of the book on Nerdist calls the novel "a sinister saga that you won't be able to put down."

Publication 
The story was written by Pommepuy and Fabien Vehlmann. Beautiful Darkness was first published by Drawn & Quarterly in 2009 and translated by Helge Dascher.

References 

French graphic novels
Fantasy graphic novels
2009 graphic novels